Miss Universe Colombia 2023 will be the 3rd edition of the Miss Universe Colombia pageant, to be held in Colombia. María Fernanda Aristizabal Urrea of Quindio will crown her successor at the end of the event.

Contestants
24 delegates have been selected:

Judges

Notes

References

Beauty pageants in Colombia
2023 beauty pageants
2023 in Colombia